The 1965 Boston Red Sox season was the 65th season in the franchise's Major League Baseball history. The Red Sox finished ninth in the American League (AL) with a record of 62 wins and 100 losses (this is, to date, the most recent season the team has lost 100+ games in a season), 40 games behind the AL champion Minnesota Twins, against whom the 1965 Red Sox lost 17 of 18 games. The team drew only 652,201 fans to Fenway Park, seventh in the ten-team league but the Red Sox' lowest turnstile count since 1945, the last year of World War II.

Offseason 
 November 30, 1964: Tim Cullen was drafted from the Red Sox by the Washington Senators in the 1964 first-year draft.

Regular season

Season standings

Record vs. opponents

Notable transactions 
 June 8, 1965: Amos Otis was drafted by the Red Sox in the 5th round of the 1965 Major League Baseball Draft.

Opening Day lineup

Roster

Player stats

Batting

Starters by position 
Note: Pos = Position; G = Games played; AB = At bats; H = Hits; Avg. = Batting average; HR = Home runs; RBI = Runs batted in

Other batters 
Note: G = Games played; AB = At bats; H = Hits; Avg. = Batting average; HR = Home runs; RBI = Runs batted in

Pitching

Starting pitchers 
Note: G = Games pitched; IP = Innings pitched; W = Wins; L = Losses; ERA = Earned run average; SO = Strikeouts

Other pitchers 
Note: G = Games pitched; IP = Innings pitched; W = Wins; L = Losses; ERA = Earned run average; SO = Strikeouts

Relief pitchers 
Note: G = Games pitched; W = Wins; L = Losses; SV = Saves; ERA = Earned run average; SO = Strikeouts

Awards and honors 
Carl Yastrzemski, Gold Glove Award (OF)

Farm system 

LEAGUE CHAMPIONS: Toronto, Pittsfield

Source:

References

External links
1965 Boston Red Sox team page at Baseball Reference
1965 Boston Red Sox season at baseball-almanac.com

Boston Red Sox seasons
Boston Red Sox
Boston Red Sox
1960s in Boston